Hannah Louise Mills,  (born 29 February 1988) is a British competitive sailor and two-time world champion in the Women's 470 class, having won in 2012 and 2019. Mills won a silver medal for Team GB with her crew Saskia Clark in the 2012 Olympics, she followed this up with a gold in the same event at both the 2016 Olympics in Rio de Janeiro and, partnered by Eilidh McIntyre, the 2020 Olympics in Tokyo

Early life
Mills was born in Cardiff, Wales, and started sailing at Cardiff Sailing Centre (then Llanishen Sailing Centre) when she was 8 years old after trying sailing on a family holiday in Cornwall. Mills then started moving up to sail for the Welsh National Optimist Squad and winning the British Optimist Championships in 2001. She represented GBR at the 2002 and 2003 Optimist World Championship finishing first girl and fifth over-all in 2003, the best ever result by a British sailor at that championship.

Mills attended Howell's School, Llandaff in her teen years, with her now retired relative being a teacher there. She is part of the schools pay only alumnus programme, sometimes visiting the school to talk about her achievements.

Career

At the 2011 Skandia Sail for Gold regatta and the 2011 Weymouth & Portland International Regatta, Hannah won a silver medal in the 470 Women class.

After suffering a black flag in the very first race of the championships, Hannah and her crew Saskia claimed gold at the 2012 470 World Championships in Barcelona.

On 10 August 2012 Hannah Mills helming for Saskia Clark won a silver medal at the Olympic games in Weymouth. Mills battled hard throughout the event, not finishing outside the top 6 the entire regatta. She went into the medal race with crew Saskia Clark equal points with the New Zealand team and far enough ahead of the rest of the fleet that both boats were battling it out for Gold and Silver. After a great start, however, there was a dramatic wind shift and they came 9th in the medal race, which gave them the Silver medal.

On 10 December 2014, Mills and Clark were robbed at knifepoint in Rio de Janeiro while in training for the 2016 Olympics.

Mills and Clark won gold at the 2016 Olympics in Rio de Janeiro. In October 2019, Mills was named as one among 12 sailors by British Olympic Association for Tokyo 2020.

Mills was selected as one of the GB flag bearers at the 2020 Olympics in Japan, which took place in July 2021.

On 4 August 2021, Hannah Mills and Eilidh McIntyre won a gold medal in the Women's 470 at the Tokyo Olympics.

On 2 December 2021, Hannah won the World Sailor of the Year Awards alongside McIntyre.

Awards and honours
In 2002, Mills was voted UK Young Sailor of the Year and BBC Wales Young Sports Personality of the Year.

Mills won the Female World Sailor of the Year award in 2016.

Mills was appointed Member of the Order of the British Empire (MBE) in the 2017 New Year Honours and Officer of the Order of the British Empire (OBE) in the 2022 New Year Honours for services to sailing and the environment.

References

External links
 
 
 
 
 RYA Profile 

1988 births
Living people
Welsh female sailors (sport)
Sportspeople from Cardiff
Olympic sailors of Great Britain
Olympic medalists in sailing
Welsh Olympic medallists
Sailors at the 2012 Summer Olympics – 470
Medalists at the 2012 Summer Olympics
Olympic silver medallists for Great Britain
Extreme Sailing Series sailors
420 class world champions
470 class world champions
Sailors at the 2016 Summer Olympics – 470
Medalists at the 2016 Summer Olympics
Sailors at the 2020 Summer Olympics – 470
Medalists at the 2020 Summer Olympics
Olympic gold medallists for Great Britain
World champions in sailing for Great Britain
ISAF World Sailor of the Year (female)
Officers of the Order of the British Empire